Wheelwright is an English surname. Notable people with the surname include:

Edmund M. Wheelwright (1854–1912), American architect
Edward Lawrence Wheelwright (1921–2007), Australian economist and political theorist
Esther Wheelwright (1696-1780), Ursuline nun in Québec
Horace William Wheelwright (1815–1865), English naturalist and writer
John Wheelwright (1592–1679), English clergyman and early American settler
John Brooks Wheelwright (1897–1940), American poet
Philip Wheelwright (1901–1970), American philosopher
William Wheelwright (1798 --1873), American businessman

English-language surnames
Occupational surnames
English-language occupational surnames